Vaillant may refer to:

Vaillant (surname)
Vaillant (automobile)
Vaillant, Haute-Marne, a commune of the Haute-Marne department, France
Vaillant (magazine) and Vaillant, le journal de Pif, children's magazines
Vaillant Group, a group of companies operating in the HVAC and Renewable Energy sectors
a ship sunk by an iceberg in 1897 with the loss of 78 lives
Le Vaillant, a French pigeon appointed to the Legion of Honour in 1916

See also
Vaillante, a fictional automobile company in the French comic strip Michel Vaillant